Kigezi sub-region is a region in Western Uganda that consists of the following districts:

 Kabale District
 Kanungu District
 Kisoro District
 Rukungiri District

The area covered by the above districts constituted the former Kigezi District. The sub-region is further divided into the following counties:

 Rukiga County in Kabale District
 Ndorwa County in Kabale District
 Rubanda County in Kabale District
 Kinkizi County in Rukungiri District
 Rujumbura County in Rukungiri District
 Kisoro County in Kisoro District

The sub-region was home to approximately 1.2 million inhabitants, according to the 2002 national census. The majority of the inhabitants of the sub-region belong to three major ethnic groups: (a) the Bakiga, the Bahororo and Banyarwanda. Other ethnicities include (d) the Batwa, the Bafumbira and others. The inhabitants of the sub-region also collectively refer to themselves as Abanyakigezi (singular Omunyakigezi).

See also
Regions of Uganda
Districts of Uganda
Western Region, Uganda

References

Sub-regions of Uganda
Western Region, Uganda